Woman to Woman is the fifth studio album by American singer-songwriter Keyshia Cole. It was released on November 19, 2012, through Geffen Records and Interscope Records. Recording sessions took place between early 2011 and mid-late 2012. Cole enlisted a variety of producers, such as Darhyl Camper, Harmony Samuels, Rodney Jerkins, T-Minus, Vidal, and Wonda. Musically, the album is an R&B record, that features guest appearances from Lil Wayne, Meek Mill, Ashanti, Elijah Blake, and Robin Thicke.

Three tracks from Woman to Woman were released as singles, all of which were supplemented by music videos. The lead single, "Enough of No Love", was released on July 3, 2012. The song received a positive reception from critics and peaked at number 84 on the US Billboard Hot 100 chart, as well as reaching the top-10 of the US Hot R&B/Hip-Hop Songs chart. "Trust and Believe" was released on October 2, 2012, as the second single from the album. The third and final single, "I Choose You", was sent to urban contemporary radio on August 23, 2013.

Upon its release, Woman to Woman received generally positive reviews from music critics, who commended its progression from Cole's previous album and the concept. The album debuted at number 10 on the US Billboard 200 chart, selling 96,000 copies in its first week. It also peaked at number two on the US Top R&B/Hip-Hop Albums chart. Further promotion was done by Cole through the Woman to Woman Tour (2013), which included shows in North America and Europe.

Background and development
In December 2010, Cole released her fourth studio album Calling All Hearts. The album debuted at number nine on the US Billboard 200 chart, with first-week sales of 128,000 copies. It spawned the two singles, "I Ain't Thru" and "Take Me Away", which both achieved lackluster success, peaking at number 54 and number 27, respectively, on the US Hot R&B/Hip-Hop Songs chart. Following the album's release, she parted ways with her longtime manager Manny Halley and also disclosed that business disagreements played a part in their split. On March 30, 2011, Cole announced via Twitter that she had recruited a management team in place of Halley and also had plans to work on a follow-up album to Calling All Hearts.

In September 2011, Cole confirmed via Twitter that she had begun working on her fifth studio album. Cole also deemed that the album's material was different from her previous four albums and described it as a return "to her roots". During the album's recording process, she told her fans that they could expect her "redhead Keysh" alter ego to return on the album and revealed that she planned on working with several artists, such as Brandy, Boi-1da, Ester Dean, and Trey Songz, among others. On August 1, 2012, Cole appeared on the BET countdown show 106 & Park and revealed that the album would be released in fall 2012, alongside her reality television series Keyshia & Daniel: Family First. During the interview, she said, "I took myself out of the equation this time around and I focused on my fans, just [to] make sure that they're gonna be happy".

Recording and production 

The development process of Woman to Woman took place between September 2011 and October 2012. Cole recorded the album in sessions at Geffen's headquarters in Santa Monica, Chalice Recording Studios in Los Angeles, Westlake Recording Studios in West Hollywood, MSR Studios in New York City (NYC), and Cole's home studio in Cleveland. The tracks were mastered by Chris Gehringer at Sterling Sound Studios in NYC and were mixed by Jaycen Joshua, with assistance from Trehy Harris at Larrabee Sound Studios in Los Angeles.

In 2011, Cole began early stages of production, working with producers Boi-1da, Cool & Dre, Earl Powell, Toxic, and Dean. In January 2012, record producer Sak Pasé stated that he had been working on songs with Cole. In August 2012, Cole revealed that she was also working with hip hop record producers DJ Mormile and G. Roberson for Woman to Woman. Cole reunited with record producer Rodney Jerkins, with whom the singer had not collaborated with since her second studio album Just like You (2007).

For Woman to Woman, Cole enlisted the help of several songwriters including Elijah Blake and Jessy Wilson, who co-wrote several of the songs. Cole drew inspiration for the songs from the real-life experiences of her friends. Explaining the writing process, Cole told J. Medina of Thisis50 that Woman to Woman reflected around her musical growth and she wanted to speak directly to her female audience from her point of view. She continued, "I brought songwriters on for this album and we were able to capture some moments in some of [my friends'] lives as well."

Music and lyrics 

Woman to Woman opens with "Enough of No Love", an R&B and hip hop song about a woman who is fed up with being in a relationship where she is not appreciated, which features guest vocals from Lil Wayne. According to Kimberly Hines of Soul Bounce, the song was reminiscent to the love triangle between Stevie J, Joseline Hernandez, and Mimi Faust that was documented on the first season of Love & Hip Hop: Atlanta. The next track, "Zero" features guest vocals from Meek Mill, whose verse is characterized as a "smooth cameo". Lyrically, the song revolves around a man who has been unfaithful in a relationship and has told multiple lies, as Cole sings on the refrain, "It pays to tell the truth, look at what you had to lose / Should think before you do / Did you not know the rules?" Described as a "post-breakup anthem", the third track, "Missing Me", is a smooth upbeat song where she reflects on a past relationship and is angry that things did not work out. It is followed by "Trust and Believe", a sentimental ballad that follows the same type of theme that was displayed on the previous tracks. The song includes an ambient instrumentation combined with a soul jazz sound that "builds tension" once she starts singing the chorus of "Trust and believe me, she'll never be me / I'm so over you, go get lost / boy I don't know who you think you are".

The album's fifth track, "Get It Right", is a new jack swing and dance-pop song where Cole believes her lover is cheating on her. The lyrics include: "You don't stroke it like you used to, do it like you used to, do it / Ain't got me moanin' like you used to, own it like you used to, own it." The next track on Woman to Woman is the title track, a duet with Ashanti. Described as a "girl power anthem with a twist", the song centers around two women who discover that they are dating the same man and have a conversation about what to do. "Wonderland" is a tender duet with Blake that captures the feelings of a couple in love. It is followed by "I Choose You", a sentimental ballad with snare drums and horns. Lyrically, the song reflects on having an ex-lover that is irreplaceable, despite dating someone else. "Stubborn" is an uptempo dance-pop song that includes techno elements and a piano played in the background. The lyrics find Cole self-reflecting on how her stubborn ways have caused problems in her love life.

Described as a "contemporary lovemaking 'til sunset" song, "Hey Sexy" is a 1990s-inspired midtempo song where she expresses her excitement over a newfound love. "Next Move" features guest vocals from Robin Thicke, and centers around a standoff between a woman and a man with a complicated history, who do not want to admit their desire for each other. The album's final song of the standard edition, "Signature" is a love song about Cole finally finding love, with lines such as, "I can't believe I found love, I finally have peace".

Release and artwork 
In October 2011, Cole announced that her fifth album would be titled Woman to Woman. The title was inspired by Cole's decision to connect with her female audience through the album. Its cover artwork was taken by American photographer Derek Blanks as an alter ego photoshoot, which took place on June 28, 2012. In August 2012, Cole held a cocktail hour at the James Hotel in NYC to celebrate Woman to Woman and her return to the music scene, with the likes of Bevy Smith, Michaela Angela Davis, and Phillip Bloch in attendance. On October 11, 2012, Cole revealed the covers for the standard and deluxe editions. When asked about the album cover, Cole said: "I have to for a second step outside of myself. The pain I've experienced and the things I've been through, you don't forget."

Cole expressed her excitement for the album's release and guaranteed the enjoyment of her fans, deeming it a "dope album". Woman to Woman was first expected to be released in February 2012. However, more recording and production pushed the release to November 19, 2012, comprising the standard, deluxe, Target deluxe, and iTunes deluxe versions. On November 2, the album was made available for pre-order via iTunes. Afterwards, a listening party for it was held in Los Angeles on November 5, 2012.

Promotion

Live performances and tour 

Cole began her promotion of Woman to Woman with a live performance of "Enough of No Love" at the Essence Music Festival on July 6, 2012. Two months later, she performed the song alongside Lil Wayne at the iHeartRadio Music Festival on September 22. Cole performed "Trust and Believe" for the first time at the Black Girls Rock! ceremony, which aired via BET on November 4, 2012. The performance was met with positive reviews from critics. On November 16, 2012, Cole performed at WGCI's Big Jam event, where her setlist included "Enough of No Love" and "Trust and Believe". Later the same month, she performed both songs again at the Soul Train Music Awards. Cole performed "Zero" for the first time at An Evening of Stars: Educating our Future, an annually-held event promoted by UNCF, which aired through BET on January 27, 2013. She later performed "Trust and Believe" and "I Choose You" on Jimmy Kimmel Live!, in an appearance aired on March 18. On July 3, 2013, Cole performed at the Essence Music Festival, singing her previous singles as well as "Trust and Believe".

The album received further promotion from the Woman to Woman Tour, which started on March 28, 2013, in Westbury, New York. Prior to the inception of the tour, Cole expressed her desire to include strong vocalists as support acts, such as Brandy and Melanie Fiona. The first leg consisted of 18 dates, visiting venues in North America, while the second row of shows comprised seven concerts throughout Europe. Chrisette Michele and Mateo served as supporting acts during the first leg.

Singles 
The lead single from Woman to Woman, "Enough of No Love", which features Lil Wayne, was released for streaming and digital download on July 3, 2012, the day after its radio premiere. It received positive commentary from music critics; reviewers complimented Cole's vocals and the song's catchy chorus. Debuting at number 94 on the US Billboard Hot 100, it went on to peak at number 84, as well as peaking at number seven on the Hot R&B/Hip-Hop Songs. An accompanying music video, directed by Benny Boom, was released on August 1, 2012. It depicts Cole in a state of emotional distress as she sings the song while sitting in a padded cell and Lil Wayne rapping his verse sat atop a piano. "Trust and Believe" was released as the album's second single on October 2, 2012. The song peaked at number two on the US Bubbling Under Hot 100 and number 32 on the Hot R&B/Hip-Hop Songs. The song's music video, directed by Benny Boom, features Cole playing the role of a woman who finds out that her lover and her best friend are having an affair. "I Choose You" was serviced to US urban contemporary stations on August 23, 2013, as the third single of Woman to Woman. The song peaked at number 18 on the US Adult R&B Songs chart and remained on the chart for 18 weeks. Its black-and-white music video, directed by Ethan Lader, displays a story of Cole being in love with two men and struggling to choose the one whom she ultimately wants to be with. The music video premiered through BET's 106 & Park on October 2, 2013.

Critical reception

Woman to Woman was met with generally positive reviews from music critics. At Metacritic, which assigns a normalized rating out of 100 to reviews from mainstream publications, the album received an average score of 78, based on five reviews. Tanner Stransky of Entertainment Weekly felt that the album served as a "time machine to the sweet, soulful R&B of the late '90s" and praised her vocal delivery on the highlighted songs. In a positive review for AllMusic, Andy Kellman applauded the album's concept and deemed it among her best work. Rick Florino from Artistdirect deemed Woman to Woman as an "essential record", and highlighted Cole's "magnificent voice" and "impressive delivery" on the album. Mark Edward Nero of Dotdash Meredith labeled the album as "angrily defiant" and "consistently good".

Steve Jones of USA Today designated Woman to Woman "Album of the Week", summarizing: "All that lying and cheating that men do really gets Keyshia Cole's dander up, and the feisty soul singer lets them have it on Woman to Woman. [...] Then she lets them walk." The Boston Globes writer Ken Capoblanco elucidated the album as "a record from the heart that speaks on a universal level" and viewed the songs as "uniformly good". However, he criticized the album for its inclusion of rappers, as he felt that it "threaten[ed] to sink strong songs". Ben Ratliff of The New York Times found the recording to be "an R&B almanac of shaky romance [with] nearly every song [being] a first-person narrative with gnarled details, endlessly recombining data about suspicion, jealousy, pride, punishment, self-respect, the lead-up, the aftermath". Writing for The Guardian, Alex Macpherson noted that the singer "ranges through suspicion, frustration and anger, [with] her voice as heavy with emotion as ever".

Kristin Macfarlane of The New Zealand Herald eulogized Woman to Woman, viewing the theme as "strong", as well as indicating that it consisted of "anthem after anthem for those jilted by a lover". Rated R&Bs Keithan Samuels deemed the album a "masterpiece" and considered it one of the best R&B albums released during the year. Dave DiMartino, for Rolling Stone, positively insisted that the album "will likely knock [someone's] socks off". In a favorable review for SoulTracks, Melody Charles described the album as "a collection of songs that are an equal mix of her present contentment and past turbulence and turmoil", and considered it among Cole's best work. Starrene Rhett Rocque of Jet suggested that the album "shows off her growth as an artist and a person as well as a fresh openness about herself". Bae Soo-min from The Korea Herald viewed Woman to Woman as a resurgence of the singer's signature sound of sentimental ballads and felt that she shows "how an R&B diva must sound like" on the record.

Accolades
ThisisRnB listed the album at number five on their list of best R&B albums released in 2012, with an editor noting that Cole "listened to what her fans were saying and she brought the heat". In his list for The Awl, Seth Colter Walls named Woman to Woman the 47th best album of 2012. Woman to Woman was placed as an honorable mention on Soul Bounces list of 2012's best albums, while AllMusic named it the year's third best record. Rated R&B ranked the album as one of the best albums of the 2010s decade, with reviewer 
Antwane Folk affirming that Cole "regained her early career glory" on it, as well as identifying the record as "a strong return for a promising R&B legend with more fire in her belly".

Commercial performance
Woman to Woman debuted  at number 10 on the US Billboard 200 chart and number two on the Top R&B/Hip-Hop Albums chart, with 96,000 copies sold in its first week, becoming Cole's fifth consecutive top 10 album in the United States. Additionally, Woman to Woman debuted at number six on the US Tastemaker Albums chart. The album spent a total of 20 weeks on the chart, and had sold a total of 246,300 copies in the US by January 2013.

In the United Kingdom, Woman to Woman debuted at number 27 on the UK R&B Albums chart and number 87 on the UK Digital Albums chart, marking Cole's first entry on any UK chart since Just like You debuted on both these component charts and the main chart in October 2007. In South Korea, Woman to Woman peaked at number 85 on the South Korean Albums chart.

Track listing

Notes 
 denotes co-producer

Credits and personnel
Credits are adapted from the liner notes of Woman to Woman.

Vocals
 Keyshia Cole – vocals, background vocals
 Guordan Banks – background vocals
 Sean "Elijah Blake" Fenton – featured vocals, vocal backgrounds
 Nikki Flores – background vocals
 Jessyca Wilson – background vocals
 Ashanti – featured vocals, background vocals
 Tiyon "TC" Mack – background vocals
 Terius "The-Dream" Nash – background vocals
Robin Thicke – featured vocals
Lil Wayne – featured vocals

Musicians
 Eric Hudson – drums
 Andrew Clifton – drums
  Earl Powell – keyboards
 Walter English III – keyboards
 Jannina Norpoth – violin
 Carlos "Los" McKinney – keyboards
 Ryan Viti – guitar
 Andre "Dre" Bowman – bass guitar

Producers and technical

 Harmony "H-Money" Samuels – production
 Vidal Davis – production
 Tyler "T-Minus" Williams – production
 Eric Hudson – production
 Darhyl "DJ" Camper, Jr. – production
 Guordan Banks – production
 Fredrick "Toxic" Taylor – production
 Walter English III – production
 Melvin "Mel" Hough – production
 Rivlino "Mus" Wouter – production
 Jerry "Wonda" Duplessis – production
 Arden "Keyz" Altino – production
 Akene "The Champ" Dunkley – production
 Olivier "Akos" Castelli – production
 Rodney "Darkchild" Jerkins – production
 Paul "Hollywood Hotsauce" Dawson – production
 Jack Splash – production
 Kuk Harrell – vocal production
 Carlos "Los" McKinney – production
 Bink! – production
 Dru Castro – production
 Uforo "TAKTIX" Ebong – production
 Ryan "Rykez" Williamson – production
 Brian White – engineer
 David Nakaji – engineer
 Jaycen Joshua – mixing
 Chris Gehringer – mastering

Charts

Weekly charts

Year-end charts

Release history

References

2012 albums
Albums produced by Bink (record producer)
Albums produced by Eric Hudson
Albums produced by Hit-Boy
Albums produced by Jack Splash
Albums produced by Rodney Jerkins
Albums produced by T-Minus (record producer)
Keyshia Cole albums
Geffen Records albums
Interscope Records albums